Oswald Davies  was a Welsh international footballer. He was part of the Wales national football team, playing 1 match on 22 March 1890 against Scotland.

At club level, he played for Wrexham from 1889–1890.

See also
 List of Wales international footballers (alphabetical)

References

Welsh footballers
Wales international footballers
Wrexham A.F.C. players
Place of birth missing
Date of death missing
Year of birth unknown
Association football forwards